Mary Waters may refer to:

 Mary Waters (nurse), nurse in the United States forces during the American Revolutionary War
 Mary C. Waters (born 1956), American sociologist and author
 Mary D. Waters (born 1955), member of the Michigan House of Representatives
 Mary Kirtley Waters (born 1958), director of the United Nations Information Centre in Washington, D.C.